Pavel Viktorovich Matyash (born 11 July 1987) is a Kyrgyzstani footballer who plays for FC Alga Bishkek of the Kyrgyz Premier League and the Kyrgyzstan national football team.

Career
Matyash started his career as a third-string goalkeeper for Dordoi Bishkek, appearing in cup matches.

In July 2015, Matyash signed for Maldivian side Maziya S&RC on a contract until 12 November 2015, with the option of an extension. In February 2016, Matyash signed a one-year contract with Malaysian UiTM FC.

On 5 December 2018, FC Dordoi Bishkek announced that Matyash had re-joined their club, signing alongside Anton Zemlianukhin and Azamat Baymatov. In January 2020, he returned to FC Alga Bishkek.

International
P. Matyash have played for Kyrgyzstan since 2009. In 7/1/2019, he became the first ever goalkeeper to score an own goal in Asian Cup history, then Kyrgyzstan lost 1–2.

Name
Matyash's last name (Матяш in Russian) has multiple ways of being transliterated from its original spelling in the Russian Cyrillic alphabet into the Latin alphabet. Matiash is the spelling used throughout the player's passport and other official documents. It has also been adopted by FIFA and is the preferred spelling in most English publications (although Matyash is also used elsewhere).

Career statistics

Club

International

Statistics accurate as of match played 15 October 2019

Honours

Dordoi
Kyrgyzstan League (5); 2007, 2008, 2009, 2011, 2012
Kyrgyzstan Cup (3): 2008, 2010, 2012
Kyrgyzstan Super Cup (3): 2012, 2013, 2014
AFC President's Cup (2): 2006, 2007
AFC President's Cup Runner-up (3): 2008, 2009, 2010

Maziya
President's Cup (Maldives): 2015

Kyrgyzstan
Nehru Cup 3rd place: 2009

Individual
Kyrgyzstan League Best goalkeeper (2): 2011, 2013

References

External links

1987 births
Living people
Sportspeople from Bishkek
Kyrgyzstani people of Russian descent
Kyrgyzstani footballers
Kyrgyzstani emigrants to Russia
Kyrgyzstani expatriate footballers
Association football goalkeepers
Footballers at the 2006 Asian Games
Footballers at the 2010 Asian Games
FC Dordoi Bishkek players
FC Alga Bishkek players
Maziya S&RC players
UiTM FC players
FC AGMK players
Kyrgyz Premier League players
Uzbekistan Super League players
2019 AFC Asian Cup players
Asian Games competitors for Kyrgyzstan
Kyrgyzstan international footballers
Expatriate footballers in the Maldives
Kyrgyzstani expatriate sportspeople in the Maldives
Expatriate footballers in Malaysia
Kyrgyzstani expatriate sportspeople in Malaysia
Expatriate footballers in Uzbekistan
Kyrgyzstani expatriate sportspeople in Uzbekistan